M. Feraud was a French diplomat of the 18th century who went on a mission to resume official French East India Company contacts with Burma in 1769. He obtained a trade treaty, and the establishment of a French factory in the city of Rangoon.

Embassy to Burma
The arrival of the embassy was facilitated by Chevalier Milard, a French officer in the service of the king of Burma, as Chief of the Guard. The king of Burma Hsinbyushin welcomed Feraud's embassy, and accepted Feraud's offer for trade, in exchange for the supply of guns and ammunitions. The king remitted a letter of agreement, which Feraud brought back to Pondicherry:

Given the previous involvement of the French with the dissident Mon under Sieur de Bruno, the king of Burma clearly specified that French arm trade should involve him only.
As a result of the embassy, the French obtained a large ground in Rangoon where they were able to establish warehouses.

Works
 Feraud, M. "Journal du Voyage de M. Feraud au Royaume d'Ava." 1770

See also
 France-Burma relations

Notes

References
 SOAS Bulletin of Burma Research, Vol. 2, No. 2, Autumn 2004, ISSN 1479-8484 ("A voyage to Pegu", translation of A Voyage to the East-Indies and China; Performed by Order of Lewis XV. Between the Years 1774 and 1781. Containing A Description of the Manners, Religion, Arts, and Sciences, of the Indians, Chinese, Pegouins, and of the Islanders of Madagascar; Also Observations on the Cape of Good Hope, the Isles of Ceylon, Malacca, the Philippines, and Moluccas. by Monsieur Sonnerat, Commissary of the Marine, (Vol. III, book 4, chapter 2). 
 Keat Gin Ooi, Southeast Asia: A Historical Encyclopedia, from Angkor Wat to East Timor ABC-CLIO, 2004 ,  

18th-century French diplomats
18th century in Burma